Steve, Steven or Stephen Arnold may refer to:

Steve Arnold (racing driver) (born 1971), British race car driver
Steve Arnold (footballer, born 1951), English former footballer
Steve Arnold (footballer, born 1989), English footballer
Steve Arnold (venture capitalist), co-founder of Polaris Venture Partners
Stephen Arnold (composer), American jingle writer
Stephen Arnold Music, a Dallas-based music production company
Stephen Arnold (scientist), professor at the Polytechnic Institute of New York University
Steven Arnold (born 1974), English actor
Steven F. Arnold (1943–1994), American artist
Steven L. Arnold (born 1940), American Army lieutenant general